Barry Moore may refer to:

 Barry Moore (baseball) (born 1943), American baseball player
 Barry Moore (Canadian politician) (born 1944), Canadian politician
 Barry Moore (Alabama politician), American politician
 Barry Moore, Irish folk-rock singer-songwriter, now known as Luka Bloom, brother of Christy Moore.